The Erick and Kristina Nelimark Sauna is a historic Finnish sauna in Embarrass, Minnesota, United States.  It was built around 1930.  The sauna was listed on the National Register of Historic Places in 1990 for its state-level significance in the themes of agriculture, architecture, and European ethnic heritage.  It was nominated for reflecting the area's settlement by Finnish American farmers and their use of traditional log construction.

The sauna is preserved on the grounds of the Nelimark Homestead Museum.

See also
 National Register of Historic Places listings in St. Louis County, Minnesota

References

1930 establishments in Minnesota
Buildings and structures in St. Louis County, Minnesota
Cultural infrastructure completed in 1930
Finnish-American culture in Minnesota
Finnish-American history
Log buildings and structures on the National Register of Historic Places in Minnesota
National Register of Historic Places in St. Louis County, Minnesota
Saunas